John Cyril Bennett (June 21, 1891 – 1957) was a British-born American architect.

Early life 
Bennett was born in Hereford, England.

Career 
As an architech, Bennett designed several buildings in Pasadena, California, including the Pasadena Playhouse, the Pasadena Civic Auditorium, the Raymond Theatre in Pasadena, California, and the house at 1155 North Hill Avenue.

Personal life 
On April 16, 1913, Bennett married Olivia Cobb. In 1955, Bennett became a naturalized U.S. citizen.

See also 
 George Bergstrom
 Fitch Harrison Haskell

References

1891 births
1957 deaths
People from Hereford
People from Pasadena, California
Architects from Los Angeles
British emigrants to the United States
20th-century American architects